On April 5–6, 1936, an outbreak of at least 12 tornadoes struck the Southeastern United States. Approximately 454 people were killed by these tornadoes—419 by two tornadoes alone. This outbreak is the second deadliest ever recorded in US history. Although the outbreak was centered on Tupelo, Mississippi, and Gainesville, Georgia, where the fourth and fifth deadliest tornadoes in U.S. history respectively occurred, other destructive tornadoes associated with the outbreak struck Columbia, Tennessee; Anderson, South Carolina; and Acworth, Georgia.

This is the only continuous tornado outbreak in United States history to produce more than one tornado with triple digit death tolls. Severe flash floods from the associated storms produced millions of dollars in damage across the region.

Confirmed tornadoes

April 5 event

April 6 event

Tupelo, Mississippi

Around 8:30 p.m., April 5, 1936, the Tupelo tornado, the fourth-deadliest tornado in United States history, emerged from a complex of storm cells and touched down in a rural area approximately eight miles outside of the city. Making its way toward Tupelo, the massive tornado killed a family of 13 as their house was swept away, and injured many more before reaching Tupelo's west side. Retroactively rated F5 on the modern Fujita scale, it caused total destruction along its path through the Willis Heights neighborhood. Dozens of large and well built mansions were swept completely away in this area. Although missing the business district, the tornado moved through the residential areas of north Tupelo, destroying many homes, and killing whole families. The Gum Pond area of Tupelo was the worst hit. Homes along the pond were swept into the water with their victims. The majority of the bodies were found in Gum Pond, the area which is now Gumtree Park. Reportedly, many bodies were never recovered from the pond. Reports were that the winds were so strong, pine needles were embedded into trunks of trees. As the tornado exited the city's east side, the large concrete Battle of Tupelo monument was toppled to the ground and destroyed. Two nearby brick gate posts were broken off at the base and blown over as well. East of town, granulated structural debris from the city was strewn and wind-rowed for miles through open fields. According to records, the Tupelo tornado leveled 48 city blocks and at least 200—perhaps up to 900—homes, killing at least 216 people and injuring at least 700 people. The tornado destroyed the water tower and produced numerous fires in its wake, though overnight rains which left knee-deep water in some streets contained the flames. Though 216 remained the final death toll, 100 persons were still hospitalized at the time it was set. Subsequently, the Mississippi State Geologist estimated a final, unofficial death toll of 233. Notably, among the survivors were one-year-old Elvis Presley and his parents.

Gainesville, Georgia

After producing the Tupelo tornado, the storm system moved through Alabama overnight and reached Gainesville, Georgia, at around 8:30 a.m. This early morning tornado was a double tornado event: one tornado moved in from the Atlanta highway, while the other moved in from the Dawsonville highway. The worst tornado-caused death toll in a single building in U.S. history was at the Cooper Pants Factory. The multiple-story building was then filled with young workers, who had just arrived to work. The structure collapsed and caught fire, killing about 70 people. At the Pacolet Mill, 550 workers moved to the northeast side of the building and survived. Many people sought refuge in Newman's department store; its collapse killed 20 people. In addition to the complete destruction that occurred throughout downtown Gainesville, residential areas throughout the city were devastated as well, where 750 homes were destroyed, and 254 others were badly damaged.

The final death toll could not be calculated because many of the buildings that were hit collapsed and caught fire. A death toll of 203 people was posted, though at the time 40 people were yet missing. The Gainesville tornado has been rated as an F4 on the Fujita scale and was the fifth deadliest tornado in U.S. history. It caused nearly $13 million in damage, equivalent to over $200 million in 2011. Gainesville was also the site of another deadly F4 on June 1, 1903, which killed 98 people. No other small town of similar size (population 17,000 in 1936) in the United States has experienced such devastation twice in its history.

President Franklin D. Roosevelt spoke from a train platform in Gainesville on April 9, after the devastating tornado struck the town a few days earlier.

References

Further reading
 Ramage, Martis, Jr. (1997). Tupelo, Mississippi, Tornado of 1936. Northeast Mississippi Historical and Genealogical Society.

External links
 The 1936 Gainesville Tornado: Disaster and Recovery from the Digital Library of Georgia
 Gainesville, GA Tornado, Apr 1936 article at GenDisasters.com
 Fujita Scale

Oral histories of the Tupelo tornado
 https://web.archive.org/web/20060613220247/http://www.lib.usm.edu/~spcol/coh/cohmorganab.html
 https://web.archive.org/web/20060619181241/http://www.lib.usm.edu/~spcol/coh/cohlonghb.html
 https://web.archive.org/web/20060619181305/http://www.lib.usm.edu/~spcol/coh/coharnolds.html
 https://web.archive.org/web/20060619181253/http://www.lib.usm.edu/~spcol/coh/cohmccombjb.html

Tupelo-Gainesville Tornado Outbreak, 1936
April 1936 events
F5 tornadoes
Tornadoes of 1936
Tornadoes in Alabama
Tornadoes in Georgia (U.S. state)
Tornadoes in Mississippi
Tornadoes in South Carolina
Tornadoes in Tennessee